The Byblos altar inscription is a Phoenician inscription on a broken altar discovered around 1923 during the excavations of Pierre Montet in the area of the Byblos temples. It was discovered outside the temples and tombs, a few meters from the hypocausts, in a modern wall.

A four-line Phoenician inscription is engraved on one side. The inscription has been translated as follows:
I, Abdeshinoun, builder, son of Is'a, made this for our Lord (the emperor) and for the statue of Ba'al. May he bless [him] and bring him to life.

The form of a number of the letters, particularly the he and the let was different from any that had been found the Lebanon previously, closer to neopunic, so it was originally dated to the Roman era. It was later redated to 200-100 BCE by Brian Peckham. As such it is considered to be of great importance as a "limiting case" of Phoenician inscriptions from Byblos.

The altar is 36cm in height, and has the inscription on only one of its faces.

It was first published in 1924-25 by René Dussaud, and is held in the National Museum of Beirut.

It is known as KAI 12, and is one of thirteen significant inscriptions discovered in Byblos.

Bibliography
 Montet, Pierre, BAH 11 - Byblos et l'Egypte Quatre Campagnes de Fouilles à Gebeil 1921-1922-1923-1924(1928), p.258, item: 1020

References

Phoenician inscriptions
Collections of the National Museum of Beirut
Phoenician religion
Archaeological artifacts
KAI inscriptions